John M. Dorso (born 1943) is a North Dakota Republican Party politician who served as the North Dakota House Majority Leader from 1994 to 1999, and in the North Dakota House of Representatives from 1985 to 1999. He was also a candidate for the United States House of Representatives in 2000, against Dem-NPLer Earl Pomeroy.

See also
2000 United States House of Representatives election in North Dakota

References

External links
John Dorso biography at legis.nd.gov

1944 births
Living people
Republican Party members of the North Dakota House of Representatives